Family Troubles is a one-reel comedy short subject and is an episode of the Our Gang series. It was released to theatres on April 3, 1943, produced and released by Metro-Goldwyn-Mayer. It was the 212th Our Gang short (213th episode, 124th talking short, 125th talking episode, and 44th MGM produced episode) that was released.

Plot
Janet feels that her parents don't love her anymore because they made her older sister the definite center of attention during her aunt's visit. Filled with anger and despair, she decides to run away. The gang volunteers to look for a family or couple who will "adapt" Janet. After naming off potential candidates, they decide on the elderly Mr. and Mrs. Tom and Mary Jones and escort Janet to their home. A neighbor boy, who witnessed them, runs over to the Burstons' house with a report that Janet was kidnapped by a gang whose leader has a heavy voice (referring to Froggy). Mary and Jasper quickly call the police.

When the gang pay the Jones a visit and offer Janet to them, the Jones quickly realize that Janet is a runaway and decide to teach her and the gang a lesson. They agree to adopt her but make her life a living hell by forcing her to scrub the kitchen floor (which causes Janet to wail, "Why did I ever leave home?") and show where she will sleep (which is under the kitchen table). When Mrs. Jones decides that Janet is unhappy enough, she walks out of the kitchen to phone Janet's parents, believing that Janet will happily run to them with open arms. But once Mrs. Jones leaves, Janet (with the help of the gang) runs away again.

The gang soon discover that the police are searching for them, so they run and hide in a cave. While trying to cook some food, they burn it and create heavy smoke, which leaves their faces covered with soot and ashes. Once they see that the smoke will hide their true identities, they bring Janet back home and tell Janet's parents why she wanted to run away.

Janet's family now realize how fortunate they are to have her. Mary apologizes for her unfeeling behavior and assures that it will never happen again. With everything happy, Froggy says, "All's well that ends well, I always say." Jasper corrects him, saying that the phrase was originally made by Shakespeare. "He did? Shucks!" answers a disappointed Froggy.

Cast

The Gang
 Janet Burston as Janet Burston
 Bobby Blake as Mickey
 Billy Laughlin as Froggy
 Billie Thomas as Buckwheat
 Mickey Laughlin as Happy

Additional cast
 Dickie Hall as Kid informing Janet's family
 Beverly Hudson as Aurelia Burston
 Barbara Bedford as Mary Burston
 Harry C. Bradley as Tom Jones
 Elspeth Dudgeon as Aunt Aurelia
 Sarah Padden as Mary Jones
 Byron Shores as Jasper Burston

See also
 Our Gang filmography

Notes
The song that Janet's sister sings for her aunt is entitled "She May Have Seen Better Days." It was written by James Thornton and published in 1894 and was a hit in 1896 for George J. Gaskin. The short shows a net profit of $4,927.00 during the 1942-43 release season in MGM records.

Sources
Demoss, Robert: Family Troubles

External links
 
 

1943 films
American black-and-white films
Films directed by Herbert Glazer
Metro-Goldwyn-Mayer short films
1943 comedy films
Our Gang films
1940s American films